Paralimna is a genus of shore flies (insects in the family Ephydridae).

Species

P. adunca Ale-Rocha & Mathis, 2015
P. adversa Cresson, 1933
P. afra (Wirth, 1956)
P. albonotata Loew, 1862
P. approximata Cresson, 1947
P. arabica Becker, 1910
P. argentea Cogan, 1968
P. argyrostoma Cresson, 1916
P. aurantia Ale-Rocha & Mathis, 2015
P. aurantiacus (Giordani Soika, 1956)
P. basilewskyi Giordani Soika, 1956
P. bicolor (Macquart, 1851)
P. bistriata Hendel, 1930
P. boensis Canzoneri & Rampini, 1990
P. brunneiceps Cresson, 1916
P. calva Bock, 1988
P. carolinika Cogan, 1968
P. castanea Ale-Rocha & Mathis, 2015
P. cilifera Hendel, 1930
P. concors Cresson, 1929
P. confluens Loew, 1862
P. cressoni Cogan, 1968
P. cruciata Cogan, 1968
P. curta Ale-Rocha & Mathis, 2015
P. dasycera Bezzi, 1908
P. decipiens Loew, 1878
P. dorina Cogan, 1968
P. fellerae Mathis, 1997
P. flavitarsis (Miyagi, 1977)
P. flexineuris Cresson, 1916
P. fulgifrons Ale-Rocha & Mathis, 2015
P. fusca Bock, 1988
P. gambiensis Canzoneri, 1989
P. guineensis Canzoneri & Meneghini, 1969
P. guttata Ale-Rocha & Mathis, 2015
P. hirticornis Meijere, 1913
P. insignis Meijere, 1911
P. insolita Cogan, 1968
P. invisa Giordani Soika, 1956
P. isis (Becker, 1903)
P. javana Wulp, 1891
P. keiseri Cogan, 1968
P. lamborni Cresson, 1947
P. ligabuei Canzoneri, 1987
P. limbata Loew, 1862
P. lineata Meijere, 1908
P. longiseta Mathis & Zatwarnicki, 2002
P. lynx Cresson, 1933
P. mackieae Cresson, 1947
P. maculata Ale-Rocha & Mathis, 2015
P. madecassa Giordani Soika, 1956
P. major Meijere, 1911
P. malleata Ale-Rocha & Mathis, 2015
P. mariae Cogan, 1968
P. meridionalis Cresson, 1916
P. millepuncta Malloch, 1925
P. molossus Schiner, 1868
P. monstruosa Giordani Soika, 1956
P. nebulosa Wirth, 1955
P. nidor Cresson, 1933
P. nigripes Adams, 1905
P. nigropicta Cresson, 1916
P. nubifer Cresson, 1929
P. obscura Williston, 1896
P. opaca Miyagi, 1977
P. ornata Canzoneri & Meneghini, 1969
P. ornatifrons Meijere, 1914
P. pallida Ale-Rocha & Mathis, 2015
P. pauca Ale-Rocha & Mathis, 2015
P. pectinata Hendel, 1930
P. picta Kertész, 1901
P. piger Cresson, 1933
P. pilosa Bock, 1988
P. pleurivittata Cresson, 1916
P. plumbiceps Cresson, 1916
P. poecila Wirth, 1956
P. pokuma Cresson, 1933
P. pseudornata Canzoneri, 1986
P. puncticollis Becker, 1922
P. puncticornis Cresson, 1916
P. punctipennis (Wiedemann, 1830)
P. pupulata Cresson, 1939
P. quadrifascia (Walker, 1860)
P. reticulata Cogan, 1968
P. rhodesiensis Cogan, 1968
P. sana Cresson, 1929
P. secunda Schiner, 1868
P. sera Cresson, 1933
P. setifemur Cresson, 1939
P. sinensis (Schiner, 1868)
P. spatiosa Bock, 1988
P. sponsa Giordani Soika, 1956
P. stellata Ale-Rocha & Mathis, 2015
P. sticta Hendel, 1930
P. stigmata Ale-Rocha & Mathis, 2015
P. stirlingi Malloch, 1926
P. taurus Cresson, 1916
P. texana Cresson, 1915
P. thomae (Wiedemann, 1830)
P. uelensis Cogan, 1968
P. ugandensis Cogan, 1968
P. uniseta Malloch, 1925
P. ustulata Wirth, 1956
P. vansomereni Cresson, 1933
P. velutina Ale-Rocha & Mathis, 2015
P. wirthi Cogan, 1968

References

Ephydridae
Brachycera genera
Taxa named by Hermann Loew
Diptera of North America
Diptera of South America
Diptera of Africa